Magdalena Parys (born 1971) is a Polish writer and translator. She studied at Humboldt University of Berlin. She has written several books, including Magik (2014) which won the European Union Prize for Literature in 2015.

Selected works
 Budapester Shoes
 Ich bin der, der angekommen ist
 The Tunnel
 Magik

References

1971 births
Polish women writers
Living people